Tylothais aculeata is a species of sea snail, a marine gastropod mollusk, in the family Muricidae, the murex snails or rock snails.<ref>Houart R. (2017). Description of eight new species and one new genus of Muricidae (Gastropoda) from the Indo-West Pacific. Novapex. 18(4): 81-103.</ref

Distribution
This marine species occurs off Papua New Guinea.

References

aculeata
Gastropods described in 1844